The Agri Horticultural Society of India was founded in 1820 by William Carey on the Alipore Road, Kolkata. It has a flower garden, greenhouses, a research laboratory and a library. It houses a massive collection of plants and flowers. It has a significant collection of botanical varieties, including Cannas for which it has a long and distinguished tradition, with facilities for gardeners and plant/flower lovers. Courses on gardening and cultivation of certain species are offered to the general public from time to time. Its very big.

External links

 

Botanical gardens in India
Cannaceae
1820 establishments in India
Organisations based in Kolkata
Horticultural organisations based in India
Horticulture in India